The Drayton United Methodist Church in Drayton, North Dakota, United States was built from 1905 to 1906 in a Romanesque Revival style.  It was listed on the National Register of Historic Places in 1979.

It was the work of New York City architect A. W. McCrea, Jr., who was from Drayton.  Its exterior is Drayton brick, and the design conforms to what is known as the Akron Plan, of the Protestant revivalist movement. The church was founded by Scots-Irish Methodist immigrants from Eastern Canada.

References

Canadian-American culture in North Dakota
Scottish-American culture in North Dakota
Churches on the National Register of Historic Places in North Dakota
Romanesque Revival church buildings in North Dakota
Churches completed in 1906
Methodist churches in North Dakota
Akron Plan church buildings
National Register of Historic Places in Pembina County, North Dakota
1906 establishments in North Dakota